

Champions

Major League Baseball
World Series: Los Angeles Dodgers over Minnesota Twins (4–3); Sandy Koufax, MVP
All-Star Game, July 13 at Metropolitan Stadium: National League, 6–5; Juan Marichal, MVP

Other champions
College World Series: Arizona State
Japan Series: Yomiuri Giants over Nankai Hawks (4–1)
Little League World Series: Windsor Locks, Connecticut
Senior League World Series: Monterrey, Mexico

Awards and honors
Baseball Hall of Fame
Pud Galvin
Most Valuable Player
Zoilo Versalles, Minnesota Twins, SS (AL)
Willie Mays, San Francisco Giants, OF (NL)
Cy Young Award
Sandy Koufax, Los Angeles Dodgers
Rookie of the Year
Curt Blefary, Baltimore Orioles, OF (AL)
Jim Lefebvre, Los Angeles Dodgers, 2B (NL)
Gold Glove Award
Joe Pepitone (1B) (AL) 
Bobby Richardson (2B) (AL) 
Brooks Robinson (3B) (AL) 
Zoilo Versalles (SS) (AL) 
Tom Tresh (OF) (AL) 
Al Kaline (OF) (AL) 
Carl Yastrzemski (OF) (AL)
Bill Freehan (C) (AL) 
Jim Kaat (P) (AL)

MLB statistical leaders

1Major League Triple Crown Pitching Winner

Major league baseball final standings

American League final standings

National League final standings

Events

January–April
January 31 – Pitcher Pud Galvin is chosen for Hall of Fame induction by the Special Veterans Committee.
March 21 – At spring training, New York Mets pitchers Gary Kroll and Gordie Richardson combined for a nine-inning no-hitter during a 6–0 win over the Pittsburgh Pirates in St. Petersburg.
April 9 – U. S. President Lyndon Johnson is on hand for an exhibition game between the New York Yankees and recently renamed Houston Astros. It is the first game to be played indoors at the new Harris County Domed Stadium, which will soon be called the Astrodome.
April 12 – The first official game at the Astrodome is played in front of over 43,000 fans, as they watch the Philadelphia Phillies defeat the host Astros, 2–0.
April 28 – Lindsey Nelson, broadcaster for the New York Mets, calls today's Mets-Astros game from a gondola suspended above second base in the Astrodome.
April 27 – Minnesota Twins pitcher Camilo Pascual, in addition to winning the game against the Cleveland Indians, helps his own cause by stroking a first-inning grand slam home run, the second of his career.  He joins Detroit Tiger Dizzy Trout as the only pitchers to have hit a pair of slams.

May–July
June 8 – The first Major League draft is held for high school and collegiate players. The Kansas City Athletics use the first overall pick to draft Rick Monday. In the tenth round, the New York Mets pick up Nolan Ryan.
July 3 – The Minnesota Twins defeat the Kansas City Athletics 3–2. Coupled with a Cleveland Indians loss, the Twins move into a tie for first place. They gain sole possession of first place on July 5, and are in first by four games by the time they complete a nine-game winning streak on July 10. They do not relinquish their lead for the remainder of the season.
July 13 – At Minnesota's Metropolitan Stadium, Willie Mays hits a home run with two walks and two runs to pace the National League to a 6–5 All-Star Game victory over the American League. Juan Marichal pitches three scoreless innings to earn Game MVP.

August
August 19 – Jim Maloney walks ten Chicago Cubs, none of whom score. Leo Cárdenas hits a home run out of Wrigley Field in the tenth inning for the game's only run; winning the no hitter for Maloney.
August 22 – During a game between the Los Angeles Dodgers and San Francisco Giants at Candlestick Park, San Francisco's starting pitcher, Juan Marichal, batting against Sandy Koufax in the third inning, attacks Dodgers catcher John Roseboro with his bat. Both benches clear and a 14-minute brawl ensues, before peacemakers such as Koufax and the Giants' Willie Mays restore order. A shaken-up Koufax then gives up a 3-run homer to Mays and the Giants win 4–3 to retake first place. National League president Warren Giles suspends Marichal for eight games and fines him $1,750, and also forbids him to travel with his team to Dodger Stadium for the final series of the season against the Dodgers.
August 26 - Tug McGraw allows 2 runs in 7.2 innings and the Mets beat the Dodgers and Sandy Koufax 5–2. It is the first time in 14 career games that the Mets beat the future Hall-of-Famer. Koufax had been 13–0 against the Mets until this game.
August 30 – Casey Stengel announces his retirement as manager of the New York Mets, ending a fifty-five-year career as player and manager.  He is the only person to have played for or managed all four of New York's Major League clubs.

September
September 2 – Ernie Banks hits his 400th career home run helping the Chicago Cubs beat the St. Louis Cardinals 5–3.
September 2 – In anticipation of their move the following season to Anaheim, the Los Angeles Angels change their name to the California Angels.
September 8 – Against the California Angels at Municipal Stadium, Bert Campaneris of the Kansas City Athletics becomes the first player to play all nine positions in the same game, as part of a special promotion featuring the popular young player. He begins the game at shortstop and plays, in order for the next eight innings, second base, third base, left field, center field, right field, first base, pitcher (he gives up a run on a hit and two walks) and catcher. With the game tied at 3–3 after nine innings, Rene Lachemann replaces Campaneris, who was injured in a collision at the plate with Ed Kirkpatrick to end the top of the ninth. California scores two runs in the 13th inning and defeats Kansas City 5–3.
September 9 – At Dodger Stadium, a duel between the Los Angeles Dodgers' Sandy Koufax and Bob Hendley of the Chicago Cubs is perfect until Dodger left fielder Lou Johnson walks in the fifth inning. Following a sacrifice bunt, Johnson steals third base and scores on a throwing error by Cubs catcher Chris Krug. Johnson later has the game's only hit, a 7th-inning double. Koufax's fourth no-hitter in four years is a perfect game, the first in Dodgers history. One hit by two clubs in a completed nine-inning game is also a major league record, as is the one runner left on base. The two base runners in a game is an ML record. For Chicago pitchers, it is the second one-hitter they've thrown against the Dodgers this year and lost. A week later in the rematch in Chicago's Wrigley Field, Hendley beats Koufax and the Dodgers, 2–1. The Cubs won't be no-hit again until July 25, by Philadelphia Phillie Cole Hamels—a span of 7,920 games.
September 13 – The San Francisco Giants' Willie Mays' hits his 500th home run off the Houston Astros' Don Nottebart, and Juan Marichal earned his 22nd victory as the Giants beat Houston 5–1 at the Astrodome. The win is the Giants' 11th straight and gives them a -game lead.
September 16 – Before only 1,247 fans at Fenway Park, Dave Morehead of the Boston Red Sox no-hits the Cleveland Indians 2–0, on the same day the Red Sox fire Pinky Higgins as general manager. Not until Hideo Nomo in  will another Red Sox pitcher hurl a no-hitter, and the next Fenway Park no-hitter won't come until  (Derek Lowe). The lone Indian baserunner comes on Rocky Colavito's second-inning walk. The home plate umpire is Ed Runge, whose grandson Brian would call balls and strikes for Jonathan Sánchez's  no-hitter.
September 18 – "Mickey Mantle Day" is celebrated at Yankee Stadium on the occasion of Mantle's 2,000th career game (all with the Yankees).
September 22 
 The Milwaukee Braves play their final game in Milwaukee, losing to the Los Angeles Dodgers 7–6 in 11 innings.
Philadelphia Phillies' Jim Bunning strikes out nine batters in a 11-5 victory over the Chicago Cubs in game 1 of a doubleheader to break the single season Phillies strikeout by one pitcher with 241, set by Grover Cleveland Alexander in 1915. Bunning went on to post 268 strikeouts.
September 25 
Though he has not pitched in the Major Leagues since , the Kansas City Athletics send Satchel Paige to the mound. At (approximately) 59 years old, he is the oldest pitcher in Major League history. In three innings, he strikes out one, and gives up one hit, a single to Carl Yastrzemski.  Paige does not earn a decision in the loss to Boston, 5–2.
Mudcat Grant, pitching for the Minnesota Twins, wins his 20th game, becoming the first black 20-game winner in the American League.  Next month, he'll be the first black winner of a World Series game, and only the seventh pitcher to homer in one.
September 26
The Minnesota Twins gain their first American League pennant since moving from Washington in 1961 by defeating the expansion Washington Senators 2–1 at Washington, D.C. (later, Robert F. Kennedy) Stadium. Minnesota's Jim Kaat (17–11) wins the clincher.
Don Drysdale holds the St. Louis Cardinals to five hits, and the Los Angeles Dodgers win their ninth in a row to move back into a tie for first place. The streak reaches thirteen.

October-December
October 2
Sandy Koufax wins his 26th game as the Dodgers beat the Braves 2–1, for their 14th win in their last 15 games as they clinch the N.L. pennant.
The New York Mets and Philadelphia Phillies play to a 0–0 tie after eighteen innings.
October 7 – Jim Kaat gives Minnesota a 2–0 World Series lead by driving in two runs, defeating Sandy Koufax and the Los Angeles Dodgers 5–1 at Minnesota's Metropolitan Stadium. The game is remembered for Minnesota's Bob Allison making a remarkable sliding catch of a Jim Lefebvre line drive in the wet grass of Metropolitan Stadium.
October 14 – Working on two days rest, Sandy Koufax strikes out ten and throws a three-hit, 2–0 shutout against the Minnesota Twins in Game Seven of the World Series, giving the Los Angeles Dodgers a second World Championship in three years. Lou Johnson's fourth inning leadoff home run off the left field foul pole gives Koufax the only run he'll need. A Ron Fairly double and Wes Parker single in the same inning add an insurance run to account for the 2–0 final. Koufax, who threw complete game shutouts in games 5 and 7,  is named Series MVP.
October 19 – The Houston Astros trade catcher Jerry Grote to the New York Mets for a player to be named later and cash. On November 24, The Mets sent Tom Parsons to the Astros to complete the trade.
November 3 - Sandy Koufax who won 26 games and a 1.73 ERA this season, was named the Cy Young Award winner for a record third time.
November 10 – San Francisco Giants outfielder Willie Mays, who hit .312 with 52 home runs and 112 RBI, is named National League MVP. Mays receives 224 votes to 177 for Sandy Koufax, who pitching for the Los Angeles Dodgers posted a 26–8 record with a 2.04 ERA and 382 strikeouts, allowing just 5.79 hits per nine innings.
November 22 – Outfielder Curt Blefary of the Baltimore Orioles edges California Angels pitcher Marcelino López for American League Rookie of the Year honors.
November 26 – Los Angeles Dodgers second baseman Jim Lefebvre, who hit .250 with 12 home runs and 69 RBI, is voted National League Rookie of the Year over Houston Astros second baseman Joe Morgan (.271, 14, 40) and San Francisco Giants pitcher Frank Linzy (9–3, 43 strikeouts, 1.43 ERA).
December 9 – Frank Robinson is traded by the Cincinnati Reds to the Baltimore Orioles for pitcher Milt Pappas, outfielder Dick Simpson, and pitcher Jack Baldschun; Robinson will win the triple crown and the MVP Award in the American League next year, leading the Orioles to the World Series title.

Births

January
January 2 – Greg Swindell
January 3 – Mark Dewey
January 3 – Luis Sojo
January 4 – Kevin Wickander
January 5 – Juan Nieves
January 6 – José DeJesús
January 10 – Wally Bell
January 11 – Tony Randazzo
January 19 – Kevin Coffman
January 20 – Brad Brink
January 20 – Kevin Maas
January 21 – Matt Stark
January 25 – Brian Holman
January 26 – Lou Frazier
January 27 – Rusty Richards
January 30 – Joel Davis

February
February 3 – Rich Scheid
February 9 – Doug Linton
February 10 – Lenny Webster
February 12 – Rubén Amaro
February 12 – Stan Fansler
February 12 – Dennis Springer
February 13 – Craig Colbert
February 16 – Frank DiMichele
February 17 – Jim Bowie
February 18 – Masaki Saito
February 19 – Wayne Rosenthal
February 20 – Paul Faries
February 20 – Tony Menéndez
February 21 – Oscar Azócar
February 22 – Eric Yelding

March
March 2 – Ron Gant
March 3 – Bert Heffernan
March 3 – A. J. Sager
March 7 – Jack Armstrong
March 9 – Benito Santiago
March 11 – Steve Reed
March 12 – Steve Finley
March 12 – Shawn Gilbert
March 14 – Kevin Brown
March 16 – José Mota
March 17 – John Smiley
March 18 – Gerónimo Berroa
March 20 – Chris Hoiles
March 21 – Tim McIntosh
March 22 – Glenallen Hill
March 25 – Jerry Kutzler

April
April 5 – Cris Carpenter
April 9 – Hal Morris
April 10 – Bruce Egloff
April 11 – Turner Ward
April 13 – Jeff DeWillis
April 17 – Craig Worthington
April 20 – Masato Yoshii
April 24 – Mike Blowers
April 27 – Bob MacDonald
April 27 – Paul Miller

May
May 2 – Félix José
May 10 – Mike Butcher
May 12 – Ángel Escobar
May 13 – José Rijo
May 14 – Joey Cora
May 15 – Isidro Márquez
May 18 – Erik Hanson
May 20 – Wayne Housie
May 20 – Todd Stottlemyre
May 22 – Larry Carter
May 24 – Greg Briley
May 24 – Rob Ducey
May 26 – Ricky Jordan
May 27 – Jacob Brumfield
May 27 – Jim Vatcher
May 29 – Charlie Hayes

June
June 1 – Jeff Nelson
June 4 – Beau Allred
June 4 – Kurt Stillwell
June 8 – Kevin Ritz
June 10 – Jim McNamara
June 17 – Manuel Lee
June 17 – Mike Magnante
June 23 – Mike Walker

July
July 2 – Steve Sparks
July 3 – Greg Vaughn
July 7 – Sam Holbrook
July 8 – Chuck Malone
July 8 – Jerome Walton
July 10 – Buddy Groom
July 12 – Mike Munoz
July 12 – Wally Ritchie
July 15 – Scott Livingstone
July 15 – Kirt Manwaring
July 21 – Mike Bordick
July 22 – Gary Buckels
July 24 – Joe Oliver
July 25 – Torey Lovullo
July 29 – Luis Alicea
July 30 – Todd Haney
July 31 – Ted Barrett

August
August 2 – Paul Marak
August 4 – Domingo Martínez
August 4 – Matt Merullo
August 6 – Atsuya Furuta
August 6 – John Ramos
August 9 – Dale Polley
August 10 – Al Osuna
August 11 – George Canale
August 11 – Carlos Martínez
August 11 – John Mitchell
August 12 – Barry Manuel
August 12 – Joe Millette
August 13 – Mark Lemke
August 16 – Xavier Hernandez
August 17 – Alex Cole
August 18 – Marcus Lawton
August 21 – Jim Bullinger
August 22 – Milt Hill
August 24 – Webster Garrison
August 26 – Carlos Quintana
August 26 – Jeff Richardson

September
September 2 – José Meléndez
September 5 – Jeff Baldwin
September 5 – Rob Richie
September 9 – Todd Zeile
September 10 – Tim Sherrill
September 11 – Quinn Mack
September 13 – Steve Curry
September 14 – Troy Neel
September 15 – Satoru Komiyama
September 18 – Jeff Bronkey
September 21 – D. J. Dozier
September 22 – Mark Guthrie
September 24 – Scott Leius
September 25 – Steve Wapnick
September 26 – Doug Piatt
September 27 – Dan Rohrmeier

October
October 4 – Steve Olin
October 6 – Rubén Sierra
October 7 – Enrique Burgos
October 8 – Jimmy Kremers
October 11 – Orlando Hernández
October 11 – Erik Johnson
October 16 – Darren Reed
October 17 – Charlie Montoyo
October 19 – Mike Gardiner
October 19 – Dave Haas
October 19 – Wade Taylor
October 23 – Al Leiter
October 25 – Steve Decker
October 26 – Zach Crouch
October 26 – Gil Heredia
October 27 – Bobby Moore
October 28 – Larry Casian

November
November 6 – Brian Givens
November 6 – Ever Magallanes
November 7 – Kevin Bearse
November 8 – Jeff Blauser
November 13 – Bob Natal
November 16 – Drew Denson
November 17 – Paul Sorrento
November 18 – Scott Hemond
November 18 – Chris Howard
November 18 – Mark Petkovsek
November 22 – Mike Benjamin
November 24 – Jeff Plympton
November 25 – Randy Veres
November 28 – Matt Williams

December
December 1 – Julio Machado
December 1 – Jeff Tackett
December 5 – Scott Lewis
December 8 – Jeff Grotewold
December 8 – John Orton
December 9 – Joe Ausanio
December 11 – Jay Bell
December 11 – Dave Joppie
December 11 – Adam Peterson
December 14 – Craig Biggio
December 14 – Ken Hill
December 16 – Randy Hennis
December 16 – Chris Jones
December 18 – Willie Blair
December 19 – Chito Martínez
December 20 – Fernando Ramsey
December 27 – Tom Marsh
December 31 – Sil Campusano

Deaths

January
January   2 – Jim Stephens, 81, catcher who appeared in 428 games for the St. Louis Browns from 1907 to 1912.
January   5 – Claude Johnson, 71, second baseman who played in the Negro leagues over seven years spanning 1922 to 1930.
January   5 – Dick Lundy, 66, All-Star shortstop and manager of the Negro leagues.
January   5 – Frank Manush, 81, third baseman in 23 games for the 1908 Philadelphia Athletics; elder brother of the Hall-of-Fame outfielder.
January   7 – George Smith, 72, pitcher in 229 games for four National League clubs, primarily the Philadelphia Phillies, from 1916 to 1923; led NL in games lost (20) in 1921.
January 11 – Wally Pipp, 71, first baseman who played in 1,872 games, notably for the New York Yankees (1915–1925) and Cincinnati Reds (1926–1928); home-run champion of the American League in 1916 and 1917, but most known for losing his regular Yankees' first-baseman job to "The Iron Horse," Lou Gehrig, on June 2, 1925; member of 1923 World Series champions.
January 13 – Brad Kocher, 76, catcher in 67 games for 1912 Detroit Tigers and 1915–1916 New York Giants.
January 14 – Bill Hopper, 73, right-hander who pitched in 19 total MLB games for the 1913–1914 St. Louis Cardinals and 1915 Washington Senators.
January 14 – Ellis Johnson, 72, pitcher who got into eight total games over three seasons between 1912 and 1917 for the Chicago White Sox and Philadelphia Athletics.
January 16 – Jimmy Williams, 88, turn-of-the-century second baseman for Pittsburgh of the National League (1899–1900), then Baltimore (1901–1902), New York (1903–1907) and St. Louis (1908–1909) of the American League, playing in 1,457 games.
January 19 – Jim Joe Edwards, 70, pitcher for the Indians, White Sox and Reds from 1922 to 1928.
January 20 – Nick Altrock, 88, left-handed pitcher for Louisville of the National League (1898), then Boston, Chicago and Washington of the American League (1902 to 1909); won 19, 23 and 20 games for 1904–1906 White Sox, and opening match of 1906 World Series, which was captured four games to two by his "Hitless Wonders" over the Cubs in all-Chicago Fall Classic; in 1912, began a 42-year stint as a Washington coach famous for clowning before games and in the coach's box during contests; known for teaming with a fellow coach, Al Schacht, the "Clown Prince of Baseball".
January 21 – Bert Whaling, 76, catcher for the 1913–1915 Boston Braves; backup receiver behind Hank Gowdy for 1914 "Miracle Braves" world champions.
January 24 – Ralph "Pep" Young, 76, second baseman who played 1,022 career games for the 1913 New York Yankees, 1915–1921 Detroit Tigers and 1922 Philadelphia Athletics.
January 25 – Bill Slater, 62, play-by-play sportscaster for the New York Yankees and New York Giants in 1944–1945 and the Mutual Radio Network's coverage of World Series and MLB All-Star Games during that decade.
January 26 – Bingo DeMoss, 75, second baseman of the Negro leagues.
January 28 – Billy Sullivan, 89, one of the best defensive catchers of his era, who played for the Boston Beaneaters (1899–1900), Chicago White Sox (1901–1912, 1914) and Detroit Tigers (1916); led American League catchers in fielding average three times, and a member of the 1906 World Series champion White Sox; managed 1909 ChiSox to a 78–74–7 record.

February
February   7 – Bruno Betzel, 70, infielder for St. Louis Cardinals in 448 games from 1914–1918; later, a longtime manager in minor leagues.
February   7 – Rube Peters, 79, pitcher for 1912 Chicago White Sox and 1914 Brooklyn Tip-Tops (of the "outlaw" Federal League).
February   8 – Ray Brown, 56, elected to the National Baseball Hall of Fame in 2006; All-Star pitcher for the Negro leagues' Homestead Grays who led the Negro National League in games won seven times between 1932 and 1945.
February   8 – Ray Kremer, 69, standout hurler for Pittsburgh Pirates (1924–1933); two-time National League ERA champion (1926, 1927); won 20 games twice, 19 games once, 18 games twice, and 17 games once between 1924 and 1930, while posting a 143–85 lifetime won–lost mark; member of 1925 World Series champions, when he went 2–1 with two complete games against the Washington Senators.
February 11 – Pete Noonan, 83, catcher/first baseman who played in 162 career games over three seasons (1904, 1906–1907) for the Philadelphia Athletics, Chicago Cubs and St. Louis Cardinals.
February 17 – Larry Gilbert, 73, outfielder in 117 games for 1914–1915 Boston Braves, including 1914 world-champion "Miracle Braves"; longtime manager in minor-league Southern Association and a major baseball figure in New Orleans and Nashville; father of two big-leaguers, Charlie and Tookie.
February 22 – Clarence Huber, 69, third baseman who appeared in 12 games for 1921–1922 Detroit Tigers and 242 contests for 1925–1926 Philadelphia Phillies.

March
March   1 – Maurice Van Robays, 50, outfielder who hit .267 in 529 career games for Pittsburgh Pirates (1939–1943 and 1946).
March   5 – Pepper Martin, 61, four-time All-Star third baseman/outfielder and an integral member of  the St. Louis Cardinals' legendary Gashouse Gang of the 1930s, who batted .298 over a 13-year career, led the National League with 122 runs scored in 1933, also in stolen bases three times, and was the catalyst in a Cardinals' upset victory over the Philadelphia Athletics in the 1931 World Series.
March   5 – Tadashi Wakabayashi, 57, Hall of Fame Japanese Baseball and NPB pitcher who played for the Osaka/Hanshin Tigers and the Mainichi Orions from 1936 to 1953.
March   6 – Wally Schang, 75, American League catcher for five teams over 19 seasons (1913–1931) and 1,842 games, including three world champions (1913 Philadelphia Athletics, 1918 Boston Red Sox and 1923 New York Yankees).
March   9 – Frank Graham, 71, New York sportswriter for over 50 years.
March 19 – Jack Quinlan, 38, broadcaster; radio voice of the Chicago Cubs from 1957 until his death in a spring-training car accident.

April
April   1 – Ernie Walker, 74, outfielder who played in 131 games for 1913–1915 St. Louis Browns; brother of Ewart "Dixie" Walker (died November 14, 1965), and uncle of future National League batting champions Fred "Dixie" Walker and Harry "The Hat" Walker.
April 11 – Sam Fishburn, 71, first baseman and pinch runner who appeared in nine games for the St. Louis Cardinals in 1919.
April 11 – Bobby Vaughn, 79, infielder in five games for 1909 New York Highlanders (American League) and 144 contests for 1915 St. Louis Terriers (Federal League).
April 16 – Chick Tolson, 66, pinch hitter and backup first baseman who appeared in 144 MLB games—three for Cleveland Indians (1925) and 141 for Chicago Cubs (1926–1927 and 1929–1930).
April 19 – Bill Lauterborn, 85, second baseman/third baseman who played 87 games for Boston of the National League in 1904–1905.
April 19 – Woodrow "Lefty" Wilson, 48, southpaw hurler in the Negro leagues who pitched from 1936 to 1940.
April 21 – Steve Biras, 48, pinch hitter/second baseman for 1944 Cleveland Indians who played in two MLB games and went two-for-two (1.000) in his pair of big-league at bats.
April 21 – Jock Somerlott, 82, first baseman in 29 total games for 1909–1910 Washington Senators.
April 29 – Johnny Watson, 57, shortstop in four September 1930 games for the Detroit Tigers.

May
May   1 – Hi Myers, 76, center fielder who appeared in 1,310 games for Brooklyn (1909, 1911, 1914–1922), St. Louis (1923–1925) and Cincinnati (1925) of the National League; member of Brooklyn's 1916 and 1920 NL champions.
May   2 – Wally Hood, 70, outfielder who played 67 MLB games between 1920 and 1922, 65 of them for the Brooklyn Robins; his son and namesake briefly pitched for 1949 New York Yankees.
May   4 – Guy Sturdy, 65, first baseman and minor-league standout who played 59 career games for the 1927–1928 St. Louis Browns.
May 13 – Dick Wantz, 25, rookie Los Angeles Angels pitcher, following surgery for brain cancer, who had made his debut only one month earlier, pitching one inning of relief in his only MLB appearance.
May 14 – Lee Quillin, 83, third baseman who played 53 games for the 1906–1907 Chicago White Sox.
May 19 – Eric Erickson, 73, pitcher in 145 career games for the New York Giants (1914), Detroit Tigers (1916, 1918–1919) and Washington Senators (1919–1922); one of four natives of Sweden to appear in major leagues.
May 23 – Earl Webb, 67, outfielder for five clubs over seven seasons between 1925 and 1933, who hit an MLB single season record 67 doubles for the Boston Red Sox in 1931.
May 25 – Harry Biemiller, 67, pitched in 28 career games for 1920 Washington Senators and 1925 Cincinnati Reds.
May 29 – Mike McNally, 72, infielder for the Boston Red Sox, New York Yankees and Washington Senators from 1915 to 1925, and later a minor league manager and scout during almost two decades.

June
June   8 – Pep Clark, 82, third baseman who played 15 games for 1903 Chicago White Stockings, but spent 17 seasons as a player or player-manager for minor-league Milwaukee Brewers.
June 15 – Jack Calvo, 71, Cuban-born outfielder who appeared in 34 total games for the 1913 and 1920 Washington Senators.
June 20 – Jay Dahl, 19, pitcher who started a game for the Houston Colt .45s on September 27, 1963 in which each of their starting nine players were rookies.
June 21 – Sandy Thompson, 70, outfielder who batted .305 lifetime in 639 games for three Negro leagues clubs (notably the Birmingham Black Barons and Chicago American Giants) from 1923 to 1932. 
June 24 – Johnny Humphries, 50, pitcher who made 211 career appearances for Cleveland Indians (1938–1940), Chicago White Sox (1941–1945) and Philadelphia Phillies (1946); in 1942, set an MLB record by hurling for ten or more innings in four consecutive starting pitcher assignments.

July
July   3 – Hank Robinson, 77, left-hander who pitched in 150 games for the Pittsburgh Pirates (1911–1913), St. Louis Cardinals (1914–1915) and New York Yankees (1918).
July   6 – Jimmy Ring, 70, pitcher who went 118–149 (4.13) over 12 seasons (1917–1928) for the Cincinnati Reds, Philadelphia Phillies, New York Giants and St. Louis Cardinals; member of Reds' 1919 World Series champions; included in high-profile Cardinals-Giants trade involving Rogers Hornsby and Frankie Frisch after 1926 season.
July   7 – Pat Burke, 64, third baseman who appeared in one MLB contest on September 23, 1924 as a member of the St. Louis Browns.
July 14 – Ike Eichrodt, 62, light-hitting outfielder for 1925–1927 Cleveland Indians and 1931 Chicago White Sox.
July 15 – Harry Fanwell, 78, pitcher who appeared in 17 games for the 1910 Cleveland Naps.
July 16 – Otis Starks, 67, left-handed pitcher who appeared for six clubs in the Negro leagues between 1921 and 1935.
July 21 – Hugh Bedient, 75, pitcher who starred as a rookie for 1912 world champion Boston Red Sox, winning 20 regular-season games and going 1–0 with a superb ERA of 0.50 over four games and 18 innings pitched in the 1912 World Series; played with Boston through 1914 and with Buffalo Blues of the "outlaw" Federal League in 1915.
July 27 – Harry Lunte, 72, reserve infielder who appeared in 49 games for the 1919–1920 Cleveland Indians, and member of 1920 World Series champions.

August
August   8 – George Crable, 80, left-hander who pitched in two games for the 1910 Brooklyn Superbas.
August 15 – Stan Pitula, 34, pitcher who appeared in 23 games for the 1957 Cleveland Indians.
August 21 – Bill Harris, 65, pitcher for the Reds, Pirates and Red Sox, who also tossed two no-hitters in the International League with the 1936 Buffalo Bisons.
August 25 – Moonlight Graham, 87, outfielder for the New York Giants in 1905 whose story was popularized in the novel Shoeless Joe and the film Field of Dreams.
August 29 – Paul Waner, 62, nicknamed "Big Poison"; Hall of Fame right fielder who won three batting titles and the National League's 1927 MVP award with the Pittsburgh Pirates, and became the seventh player to make 3,000 hits; played 15 years (1926–1940) for Pirates, with Bucs posthumously retiring his #11 uniform in 2007; brother of fellow Hall of Fame outfielder Lloyd Waner; also played for Brooklyn Dodgers, Boston Braves and New York Yankees prior to 1945 retirement.
August 30 – Frank Papish, 47, southpaw who pitched in 149 games for the Chicago White Sox (1945–1948), Cleveland Indians (1949) and Pittsburgh Pirates (1950).

September
September   1 – Ivy Olson, 79, shortstop/third baseman for the Cleveland Naps (1911–1914), Cincinnati Reds (1915) and Brooklyn Robins (1915–1924) who appeared in 1,574 games; led National League in hits (1919) and played on two pennant-winners (1916 and 1920) for Brooklyn.
September   2 – Joe Hoover, 50, shortstop who appeared in 338 games for wartime 1943–1945 Detroit Tigers; member of Detroit's 1945 World Series champions.
September 21 – Socks Seibold, 69, shortstop who became a pitcher and spent eight years in MLB, marked by stints with the Philadelphia Athletics (1915–1917 and 1919), a decade out of the majors, and five years with Boston Braves (1929–1933). 
September 22 – Biz Mackey, 68, five-time All-Star catcher and manager of the Negro leagues.
September 23 – Fred Hobgood, 43, left-handed pitcher who played in the Negro leagues between 1941 and 1946.
September 24 – Cliff Knox, 63, catcher who appeared in six games for 1924 Pittsburgh Pirates.
September 27 – Tink Riviere, 66, pitcher in 18 games for the 1921 St. Louis Cardinals and three contests for the 1925 White Sox.
September 30 – Jim Battle, 64, infielder who hit .375 in eight games for the 1927 Chicago White Sox.

October
October   3 – Delos Drake, 78, outfielder/first baseman in 335 career games for 1911 Detroit Tigers and 1914–1915 St. Louis Terriers (Federal League).
October   5 – Wid Matthews, 68, outfielder, scout and executive; played in 192 total games for Philadelphia Athletics (1923) and Washington Senators (1924–1925); general manager of Chicago Cubs (1950–1956) who later worked for Milwaukee Braves and New York Mets as assistant GM.
October 11 – Willis Cole, 83, Chicago White Sox outfielder who appeared in 68 total games in 1909 and 1910.
October 12 – Curt Davis, 62, pitcher and two-time All-Star who went 158–131 (3.42) in 429 career games over 13 seasons (1934 to 1946) with four National League clubs; won 22 games for 1939 St. Louis Cardinals and was 15–6 (2.36) for 1942 Brooklyn Dodgers.
October 15 – Fritz Brickell, 30, shortstop and second baseman who played in 41 career games for the New York Yankees (1958–1959) and Los Angeles Angels (1961); son of Fred Brickell.
October 21 – Harry Kincannon, 56, pitcher who appeared in 59 games for three clubs in the Negro leagues from 1933 to 1939.
October 23 – Ed Fitzpatrick, 75, second baseman/outfielder for Boston Braves (1915–1917).
October 23 – Otis Lawry, 71, second baseman/outfielder who played 71 games for Philadelphia Athletics (1916–1917).
October 23 – Ted Odenwald, 63, left-hander who pitched in 11 games for 1921–1922 Cleveland Indians.
October 23 – Chick Shorten, 73, outfielder and lefty-swinging pinch hitter who appeared in 527 games for four clubs, primarily the Detroit Tigers and Boston Red Sox, during eight seasons spanning 1915 to 1924.
October 24 – John Dudra, 49, infielder for 1941 Boston Braves, who appeared in 14 late-season games.
October 28 – Walter Barbare, 74, third baseman/middle infielder who played an even 500 games for the Cleveland Naps/Indians, Boston Red Sox, Pittsburgh Pirates and Boston Braves from 1914–1916 and 1918–1922.
October 29 – Frank Fuller, 72, second baseman for the Detroit Tigers (1915–1916) and Boston Red Sox (1923).
October 29 – Bill McKechnie, 79, nicknamed "Deacon", Hall of Fame manager who became the first pilot to lead three different teams to pennants: the 1925 Pittsburgh Pirates, 1928 St. Louis Cardinals, and 1939–1940 Cincinnati Reds, winning the World Series in 1925 and 1940; his 25-year managerial career produced 1,896 victories and a winning percentage of .524; as a player, he was a switch-hitting infielder who appeared in 846 games for six teams over 11 seasons between 1907 and 1920.
October 30 – Lee Fohl, 88, manager of three American League clubs over 11 seasons spanning 1915 to 1926, notably the St. Louis Browns (1921 to August 7, 1923); skipper of second-place 1922 Browns, perhaps the most talented edition of the franchise during its 52 years in St. Louis; briefly (five total games) played as a catcher in the National League in 1902 and 1903.

November
November   2 – Clarence Fisher, 67, pitcher who worked in four games as a reliever for the 1919–1920 Washington Senators.
November   4 – Johnny Mitchell, 71, shortstop who appeared in 329 games for the New York Yankees, Boston Red Sox and Brooklyn Robins between 1921 and 1925.
November   4 –  Harry Trekell, 72, pitcher in seven career games for the 1913 St. Louis Cardinals.
November 14 – Ewart "Dixie" Walker, 77, Washington Senators pitcher who hurled in 74 games from September 1909 to May 1912; father of future NL batting champions Fred "Dixie" Walker and Harry "The Hat" Walker, and brother of Ernie Walker, AL outfielder who died April 1.
November 16 – Ed Sherling, 68, minor league outfielder who appeared in four major-league games as a pinch hitter and pinch runner for the Philadelphia Athletics in 1924.
November 23 – Ruby Tyrees, 74, pitcher who appeared in five games for the Cleveland Browns of the Negro National League in 1924.
November 27 – Bill Hollahan, 67, third baseman who played in three late-season games for the 1920 Senators. 
November 29 – Stanley Woodward, 70, sports editor of the New York Herald Tribune from 1930–1948 and 1959–1962, who oversaw the coverage of Jackie Robinson's integration of Major League Baseball in 1947 and whose column on May 9 thwarted a planned strike by National League players to protest having to take the field with a black man.

December
December   5 – Mary Dailey, 37, All-American Girls Professional Baseball League infielder/pitcher.
December   6 – Frank Crossin, 74, St. Louis Browns catcher who appeared in 55 games over three seasons (1912–1914).
December   9 – Branch Rickey, 83, Hall of Fame executive who built dynasties with the St. Louis Cardinals (1919–1942) and Brooklyn Dodgers (1943–1950); known for revolutionizing the game—first by establishing the farm system of player development with the Cardinals, and again by signing Jackie Robinson to integrate the major leagues with the Dodgers; also played significant role in the front offices of the St. Louis Browns and Pittsburgh Pirates, and, late in his career, was president of the nascent Continental League (1959–1960), which never played a game but spurred expansion of MLB from 16 to 20 teams in 1961 and 1962; earlier, a catcher in the American League in 120 games between 1905 and 1914, and manager of both Browns and Cardinals.
December   9 – Dutch Sterrett, 76, pitcher for the New York Yankees from 1912 to 1913.
December 15 – Dick Newsome, 56, pitcher in 85 career games for 1941–1943 Boston Red Sox; went 19–10 (4.13) in rookie season with Boston, to place third in American League in victories.
December 15 – Charley Wilson, 70, pitcher in the Negro National League between 1920 and 1926.
December 19 – John Knight, 80, shortstop who spent 24 years in baseball, including major league stints with the  Philadelphia Athletics, Boston Americans, New York Highlanders/Yankees and Washington Senators.
December 20 – Al Lyons, 47, hard-hitting pitcher/outfielder/pinch hitter who appeared in 60 career games, 39 of them on the mound, over four seasons between 1944 and 1948 for the New York Yankees, Pittsburgh Pirates and Boston Braves; posted a 3–3 (6.30) pitching record and a .293 lifetime batting average (17 for 58).
December 27 – Bob Smith, 75, native Vermonter who pitched in 17 total games from 1913 to 1915 for Chicago (American League) and Buffalo (Federal League).
December 29 – Alex Main, 81, right-hander who pitched in 75 games for three teams in three major leagues over three seasons: the 1914 Detroit Tigers (AL), 1915 Kansas City Packers (Federal League) and 1918 Philadelphia Phillies (NL).

Sources

External links
Baseball Almanac - Major League Baseball Players Who Died in 1965
Baseball Reference - 1965 MLB Season Summary  
ESPN - 1965 MLB Season History